Thyrsanthemum is a genus of plants in the Commelinaceae, first described in 1946. The entire genus is endemic to Mexico.

 Species
 Thyrsanthemum floribundum (M.Martens & Galeotti) Pichon - Guerrero, Jalisco, Oaxaca, Michoacán, Hidalgo, Puebla
 Thyrsanthemum goldianum D.R.Hunt - Guerrero, Michoacán, México State, Nayarit
 Thyrsanthemum macrophyllum (Greenm.) Rohweder - Oaxaca

References

External links

Commelinaceae
Commelinales genera
Endemic flora of Mexico